Leather Jackets is the twentieth studio album by English musician Elton John. Recorded at Sol Studios in England and Wisseloord Studios in the Netherlands, it was released in 1986 and was his first album not to have any top 40 singles in either the US or the UK since 1970's Tumbleweed Connection, which had no singles released from it. It is also the poorest-charting album of his career.

This was John's last studio release to be produced by Gus Dudgeon. After his throat surgery in 1987, Chris Thomas would be rehired as producer.

Background
In 2001, Elton regarded "Heartache All Over the World" as the worst song he had ever recorded, calling it "pretty insubstantial"; in 2006, he would declare Jackets his least favourite of all his albums, saying "Gus Dudgeon did his best but you can't work with a loony." 

He would also call its biker-inspired cover "very butch but a total disaster. I was not a well budgie, I was married and it was just one bag of coke after another." 

(In spite of this, lyricist Bernie Taupin believes The Big Picture deserves the honour of worst album.)

In 2000, Gus Dudgeon said: "There was a chance he could polish himself off. He'd go out and do some coke and it'd be all over his mouth, his nose would be running and I'd go: 'Oh God, this is just awful'."

John has also stated in his 2019 autobiography Me that "it was about as close to an unmitigated disaster than anything I've ever released" and "overall, Leather Jackets had four legs, a tail, and barked if a postman came to the door".

"Heartache All Over the World" was the only single to achieve chart success in the US, though it failed to crack the top 50. "Slow Rivers" is a collaboration with Cliff Richard that was released as a single in the UK. Cher collaborated with "Lady Choc Ice" (actually John himself) to write "Don't Trust That Woman". Roger Taylor and John Deacon of Queen play drums and bass guitar respectively on the track "Angeline"; songwriting credit is shared with backup singer Alan Carvell, who composed the "oh-oh-oh's" that can be heard at the beginning and end of the track.

John played "Paris" during his 1986 US tour. He included "Heartache All Over the World" and "Slow Rivers" on his 1986 Australian tour with the Melbourne Symphony Orchestra, which would eventually yield John's live album Live in Australia with the Melbourne Symphony Orchestra. "Heartache" was included in the band portion of the show (John opted not to play piano for that number) while "Slow Rivers" was played during the second half of the show with the orchestra. Due to contractual constraints, "Slow Rivers" was not included on Live in Australia, despite the fact that it was from the orchestral portion of the show, which was the basis for the album. On the other hand, "Paris" became a minor FM hit for some jazz stations that programmed the track and reached the Belgium charts, peaking at #37.

This is John's only studio album from the pre-1993 period that has yet to be reissued in remastered form as of 2022; it last appeared on compact disc in the early 1990s. However, in 2008, it became available for digital download, and "Hoop of Fire" & "I Fall Apart" were both issued on Elton: Jewel Box compilation.

It's also his fourth album from the 1980s behind The Fox, Jump Up!, and Breaking Hearts that don't have any bonus tracks.

Critical reception
Matt Springer placed the album at #31 in his ranking of all of John's studio albums, criticizing it as "the worst of the '80s – awful songs with equally awful production."

In a retrospective review for Allmusic, Lindsay Planer found the material "half-hearted", performances "less than inspired" and John's voice to be "beginning to show signs of extreme fatigue and strain." They did however find "bright moments" on the album including the single and John's collaborations with Cliff Richard and Cher.

Recording
The majority of the tracks from the album were recorded during the Ice on Fire sessions in 1985. This was his last in which he played a grand piano before switching to the Roland RD-1000 digital piano for Reg Strikes Back and the two albums following that. 

For the first time in John's career, no songs on this album are longer than five minutes.

Track listing

 Sides one and two were combined as tracks 1–11 on CD reissues.
Notes
 On the LP original pressing, the Greatest Hits Volume 3 compilation, and some single releases, the length of "Heartache All Over the World" is 4:01 (incorrectly listed as "3:52" on the album sleeve), while on CD editions, including the 1992 American CD re-release, the version of "Heartache" includes a brief additional a cappella segment during the final chorus, resulting in a length of 4:17.
 Angeline is 3:24 in length on the LP version, but extended to 3:55 on the CD release.

Personnel 
Track numbering refers to CD and digital releases of the album.
 Elton John – lead vocals, Yamaha GS1 (1, 8), grand piano (2, 4–6, 10), Roland JX-8P (2, 11), MIDI piano (3), Yamaha CP-80 (11)
 Fred Mandel – synthesizer programming and sequencing (1, 4, 7), Yamaha DX7 (2, 6, 9), Korg DW-8000 (3, 10), Roland JX-8P (4, 11), Roland Jupiter 8 (5, 6, 10, 11), Roland P60 (7, 9), Prophet 2000 (7), Yamaha TX816 Rhodes (10), grand piano (11)
 Davey Johnstone – acoustic guitar (1-5, 7, 9), electric guitar (2-11), backing vocals (2, 4, 5, 7-10)
 David Paton – bass (2, 3, 5, 9-11)
 Paul Westwood – bass (6)
 John Deacon – bass (8)
 Gus Dudgeon – drum programming (1), electronic percussion (1, 4, 7)
 Dave Mattacks – drums (2, 5)
 Charlie Morgan – drums (3, 4, 6, 7, 9-11), electronic percussion (4)
 Roger Taylor – drums (8)
 Graham Dickson – electronic percussion (1, 3, 4, 7)
 Frank Ricotti – percussion (2)
 Jody Linscott – percussion (3), tambourine (7)
 James Newton Howard – string arrangements and conductor (6)
 Martyn Ford – orchestra contractor (6)
 Gavyn Wright – orchestra leader (6)
 Alan Carvell – backing vocals (2, 4, 5, 7-10)
 Katie Kissoon – backing vocals (2)
 Pete Wingfield – backing vocals (2)
 Shirley Lewis – backing vocals (4, 5, 8-10)
 Gordon Neville – backing vocals (4, 5, 7-10)
 Kiki Dee – backing vocals (6)
 Cliff Richard – lead vocals (6)
 Vicki Brown – backing vocals (7)
 Albert Boekholt – Emulator vocals and samples (9)

Production 
 Produced by Gus Dudgeon
 Tracks 1, 3, 4, 6, 7, 9 10 & 11 engineered by Graham Dickson
 Tracks 2, 5, 6 & 8 engineered by Stuart Epps
 Assistant Engineers – Albert Boekholt and Ronald Prent
 Mixed by Graham Dickson and Gus Dudgeon
 Mastered by Greg Fulginiti (US)
 Studio Coordinators – Steve Brown and Adrian Collee
 Art Direction and Design – David Costa
 Artwork – Andrew Christian
 Photography – Gered Mankowitz
 Management – John Reid

Charts

Certifications and sales

References

External links

1986 albums
Elton John albums
Albums produced by Gus Dudgeon
Geffen Records albums
The Rocket Record Company albums